Edward Mansfield may refer to:
 Edward Deering Mansfield (1801–1880), American author
 Edward S. Mansfield (1870–?), electrical engineer
 Edward Mansfield (judge) (born 1957), Justice of the Iowa Supreme Court

See also 
 Edward Mansvelt (fl. 1660s), Dutch buccaneer
 Eamonn Mansfield (1878–1954), Irish schoolteacher and public servant